Cricket Victoria (CV) is the governing body for the sport of cricket in the Australian state of Victoria. It was formed on 29 September 1875 as the Victorian Cricket Association.  It is integrated with the Victorian Women's Cricket Association to include funding, programs, office accommodation and staff assistance.

As of 2019, CV administered the 1,065 cricket clubs and 448,000 registered cricketers in Victoria, who compete across 75 cricket competitions. It employs well over a hundred full time and part time staff, and is responsible for offering professional and semi-professional contracts to several dozen of its male and female cricketers.

CV also administers the Victorian men's and women's representative teams, and the Victorian Premier Cricket competitions. It also owns and operates the Melbourne Stars and Melbourne Renegades Big Bash League teams.

References

Bibliography
 Barclays World of Cricket, (ed. E W Swanton), Willow Books, 1986

External links
 Cricket Victoria web site

Vic
Cric
Cricket in Victoria (Australia)
1875 establishments in Australia
Sports organizations established in 1875